Million Dollar Decorators is an American reality television series that premiered May 31, 2011, on Bravo. Million Dollar Decorators follows interior designers — Martyn Lawrence Bullard, Kathryn Ireland, Jeffrey Alan Marks, and Mary McDonald — who take on A-list clientele and attempt to keep up in the stressful design industry.

Episodes

Series overview

Season 1 (2011)

Season 2 (2012–13)

References

2010s American reality television series
2011 American television series debuts
2013 American television series endings
English-language television shows
Bravo (American TV network) original programming